Senator Winters may refer to:

Jackie Winters (1937–2019), Oregon State Senate
John W. Winters (1920–2004), North Carolina State Senate
Kenneth W. Winters (born 1934), Kentucky State Senate

See also
Senator Winter (disambiguation)